The Huron River is a  river in the northern Upper Peninsula of Michigan in the United States.  Locally, it is commonly called the Big Huron River to distinguish it from the nearby Little Huron River. Another much larger Huron River is in Southeast Michigan.

The east and west branches of the Big Huron rise in L'Anse Township in eastern Baraga County, southeast of Mount Arvon, near the boundary with Marquette County. The East Branch runs through a corner of Marquette County before flowing back into Baraga County. The east and west branches merge in Arvon Township shortly before flowing into Lake Superior a few miles east of Huron Bay.

The Huron River is almost completely unmodified and undeveloped by humans. It flows almost entirely through woodlands and includes a number low waterfalls and rapids.  The National Park Service ranks it highly in its Nationwide Rivers Inventory for scenery and geology.

The river is highly regarded for its sport fishing, especially for steelhead trout.  Camping and canoeing are also popular, though both are considered difficult due to a lack of supporting facilities.

Scenic waterfalls
The following is a partial list of waterfalls along the Huron River and its branches, generally listed in order heading upstream.

Huron River, mainstream
Lower Huron Falls (Big Erick's Falls)

Huron River East Branch
East Branch Falls
Big Falls

Huron River West Branch
West Branch Falls
Lower Letherby Falls
Leatherby Falls
Upper Leatherby Falls

References

Rivers of Michigan
Tributaries of Lake Superior
Rivers of Baraga County, Michigan
Rivers of Marquette County, Michigan